The Tramway at Darvault (French La voie ferrée Sablières de Darvault au Canal du Loing) was an approximately  long narrow-gauge railway with a gauge of  from the sand pits at Darvault to the Canal du Loing at Montcourt-Fromonville in France.

History 
 
The Darvault sandstone quarry has been exploited since 1885. Very high quality quartz glass can be produced from the dazzling white sand mined in the Arrondissement of Fontainebleau. It is mainly used for the production of crystal glass and optical glass, e.g. for the optical instruments of NASA.

Unlike the other sand pits in the region, where open-cast mining is practised, the Darvault quarry is partly underground. In 1891 Mrs Huot, the then owner of the site, applied for permission to build a narrow-gauge railway to transport sand between the quarries and the port of Fromonville on the Loing Canal. After Joseph Farisy and C. Besse became owners, they built the proposed railway in 1894. The tunnels were driven without systematic planning and without special safety structures, as the sand was only manually mined in small batches.

During the First World War, railway operations were suspended in 1914 and the tracks were dismantled for reuse on the Marne front. Until about 1936, transport was by horse-drawn carriage. The quarry was exhausted and abandoned before World War II.

Locomotive 
The locomotive was manufactured by Weidknecht and obtained its boiler certificate on 25 August 1891. It was then used by Decauville under the name of Hermanville for assessment, demonstration or hire on the Chemins de fer du Calvados. On 3 July 1893 it was sold to "C. Besse, Sablières, Darvault, S & M, France", where it was given the name Henriette.

According to data published in the UK, the Type 10 locomotive, had a new price of £1136, an engine capacity of 9⅞ inches × 12½ inches (bore × stroke: 250 mm × 317.5 mm), a driving wheel diameter of 2 feet 1½ inches (ø 650 mm) and a wheelbase of 4 feet 7 inches (1400 mm). It weighed 10 tonnes unloaded and 13 tonnes in working order.

Footnotes

References 

600 mm gauge railways in France
Tram transport in France
Railway lines opened in 1894
Railway lines closed in the 1890s